Markeith Knowlton (born April 6, 1983 in McKinney, Texas) is a professional Canadian football linebacker who is currently a free-agent. He was most recently a member of the Hamilton Tiger-Cats of the Canadian Football League. He went to the University of North Texas, wore number 42, is 6 feet tall and weighs 205 lbs. Knowlton wasn't selected in the 2004 NFL Draft after 4 years at North Texas. He had a brief tryout with the Cleveland Browns in April 2005.

Professional career

BC Lions
Knowlton was signed by the BC Lions on April 27, 2006. In his first year in (2006), he had 1 interception, 8 tackles and 14 special team tackles in 15 games. Knowlton helped BC win the 2006 Grey Cup. He spent 2 seasons with the Lions receiving additional playing time in his second season with the club.

Hamilton Tiger-Cats
Knowlton was traded on April 29, 2008 from BC Lions to the Hamilton Tiger-Cats along with kicker Ara Tchobanian in exchange for the 9th overall selection in the 2008 CFL Draft. In both the 2008 and 2009 CFL seasons Knowlton amassed more than 90 tackles. For the 2010 CFL season, he was award the CFL's Most Outstanding Defensive Player Award after recording 71 tackles, three sacks, three interceptions, and six fumble recoveries. His 2011 CFL season was not as productive statistically as his previous 3 seasons, totaling only 64 tackles. Injury slowed his production in the 2012 CFL season, only playing in 7 of the 18 regular season games. Following a Week 4 blowout in the 2013 CFL season Knowlton was released by the Tiger-Cats.

References

External links
Hamilton Tiger-Cats bio

1983 births
American players of Canadian football
BC Lions players
Canadian football defensive backs
Hamilton Tiger-Cats players
Canadian Football League Most Outstanding Defensive Player Award winners
Living people
People from McKinney, Texas
Players of American football from Texas